Tamokra is a small town in the Kabylie region in northern Algeria, it is a part of the province of Béjaïa.

Communes of Béjaïa Province
Algeria
Cities in Algeria